Munich 2022 may refer to:

2022 European Championships
2022 European Men's Artistic Gymnastics Championships
2022 European Women's Artistic Gymnastics Championships
2022 European Athletics Championships
2022 European Beach Volleyball Championships
2022 Canoe Sprint European Championships
2022 European Cycling Championships, see 2022 European Championships
2022 European Rowing Championships
2022 IFSC Climbing European Championships, see 2022 European Championships
2022 European Table Tennis Championships
2022 European Triathlon Championships